Cammer is a surname. Notable people with the surname include:

 Harold I. Cammer (1909–1995), American labor lawyer
 Margaret Cammer, daughter of Harold I Cammer and spouse of Joan Snyder, American painter
 Megan Cammer, Miss Charleston in the Miss South Carolina 2012

See also
Hammer (surname)